Ewell Minnis is a village near Dover in Kent, England. The population is included in the civil parish of Alkham.
See Stelling Minnis for information on the origin of the word Minnis.

References

External links

Villages in Kent
Dover District